is a 2014 supernatural, mystery anime series based on the Japanese mixed-media project, Hamatora. In the year 2014, select humans called Minimum Holders have been discovered to possess supernatural abilities. Fellow Minimum Holders—Nice and Murasaki form a detective agency called "Hamatora" based in the Nowhere Café in Yokohama where they prefer to sit around all day with their friends and wait for clients. However when they are approached by the Police Officer, Art for their help in investigating a string of serial murders throughout the city, the duo reluctantly decide to involve themselves in the case when they learn of the murderer's sole target—Minimum Holders.

The anime's first season adaptation is produced by NAZ of Japan and chiefly directed by Seiji Kishi. In addition, Hiroshi Kimura is also directing the anime, along with series composers and script writers Jun Kumagai and Touko Machida. The soundtrack music is composed by Makoto Yoshimori. Character designs are done by Yū Wazu, based on the original character designs by Blood Lad's Yūki Kodama along with art direction by Fantasista Utamaro. The project was composed by Yukinori Kitajima. The season is followed by Re:_Hamatora which premiered in Japan in July 2014.

The twelve-episode series premiered on TV Tokyo between January 8, 2014 and March 26, 2014. This was followed by later airings on TVA, TVO and AT-X. The series was picked up by Crunchyroll for online simulcast streaming in North America and other select parts of the world.  Avex Group released the series in Japan on four Blu-ray and DVD volumes between April 25 and July 25, 2014. Sentai Filmworks has licensed the anime in North America for digital and home media release. The series was released on Blu-ray and DVD in September 2014 with English and Japanese audio and English subtitles.

The series uses three pieces of musical themes: one opening theme, one ending theme and one insert song. The opening theme is "Flat" by Livetune feat. Yuuki Ozaki, while the ending theme is "Hikari" by Wataru Hatano. The insert song of episode twelve is "Nowhere Living Now" by Kishō Taniyama, also known as Torao. 


Episode list
Individual episodes are called files, such as "File-01", "File-02", and so forth.

Home media
Avex Group began releasing the series in Japan on Blu-ray and DVD volumes starting on April 25, 2014. People who purchased the first two volumes of the series will receive early entry forms for tickets to attend the Hamatora Fes 2014.summer event which will screen exclusive special footage of the series' sequel, Re:␣Hamatora at the Pacifico Yokohama on July 13, 2014.

Notes

References

External links
Official anime website

Hamatora: The Animation